Single Again may refer to:

 "Single Again" (Mariya Takeuchi song), a 1989 song by Mariya Takeuchi
 "Single Again" (Trina song), a 2007 song by Trina
 "Single Again" (Big Sean song), a 2019 song by Big Sean
 "Single Again", a 2019 song by Scott H. Biram